Nowakowskiella is the sole genus of fungi in the family Nowakowskiellaceae. The genus was circumscribed by German mycologist Joseph Schröter in 1897, while the family was originally circumscribed by Frederick Kroeber Sparrow in 1942, and then published validly in 2009.

The genus name of Nowakowskiella is in honour of Leon Nowakowski (1847-1918), who was a Polish naturalist and botanist (Algology and Mycology) from Warsau. 

The genus was published in Nat. Pflanzenfam. (Engler & Prantl) vol.1 (Issue1) on pages 77, 82 and 134 in 1897.

Species
As accepted by GBIF;

Nowakowskiella atkinsii 
Nowakowskiella crassa 
Nowakowskiella crenulata 
Nowakowskiella delica 
Nowakowskiella elegans 
Nowakowskiella endogena 
Nowakowskiella hemisphaerospora 
Nowakowskiella keratinophila 
Nowakowskiella macrospora 
Nowakowskiella methistemichroma 
Nowakowskiella moubasherana 
Nowakowskiella multispora 
Nowakowskiella pitcairnensis 
Nowakowskiella profusa 
Nowakowskiella ramosa 
Nowakowskiella sculptura

References

External links

Chytridiomycota genera
Taxa named by Joseph Schröter
Taxa described in 1893